The 1962–63 season was Chelsea Football Club's forty-ninth competitive season. In a season heavily impacted by the "big freeze" of 1963, Chelsea were promoted back to the First Division as Second Division runners-up.

Table

References

External links
 1962–63 season at stamford-bridge.com

1962–63
English football clubs 1962–63 season